The Shakey's Super League (SSL) is a women's volleyball league in the Philippines. The league is organized by Shakey's Pizza Asia Ventures Inc. (SPAVI) and the Athletic Events and Sports Management Group Inc. (ACES).

History
The Shakey's Super League was formally launched on August 16, 2022, at the Shakey's Pizza ASEANA outlet in Parañaque City.  This marks the return of Shakey's Pizza in Philippine volleyball since they served as the title sponsor for the Shakey's V-League (now Premier Volleyball League) from 2004 to 2017.

The inaugural season was the Collegiate Pre-Season Tournament composed of teams from the University Athletic Association of the Philippines (UAAP) and the National Collegiate Athletic Association (NCAA) held from September 22 to November 28, 2022, in Metro Manila. The first tournament marks the return of full preseasons for the UAAP and NCAA teams since they were forced to resort to tune-ups due to disruption caused by the COVID-19 pandemic. The second season would be the National Invitational Tournament from February to July 2023. This tournament will be wider in scope. A series of qualifiers held in the 18 regions of the Philippines will be held to determine the teams to play in the final tournament in July 2023.

Teams

Collegiate Pre-Season tournament
The following are teams that have confirmed participation in the Collegiate Pre-Season Tournament. All teams from the NCAA (10) and the UAAP (8) have confirmed participation.

Result summary

Media coverage
The Shakey's Super League has partnered with the My Plus Network which would stream its games live on its social media platforms including YouTube and TikTok.

See also 
V-League (Philippines)
Philippine Super Liga
Premier Volleyball League
NCAA Volleyball Championship (Philippines)
UAAP Volleyball Championship

References

Volleyball competitions in the Philippines
2022 establishments in the Philippines
College women's volleyball in the Philippines
College women's volleyball tournaments in the Philippines
Sports leagues established in 2022